Eurofi is a Paris-based nonprofit association that organizes non-public gatherings on European economic and financial policy. Eurofi meetings have become a regular venue for exchange between EU economic and financial policymakers and senior financial sector executives. In a 2019 feature article, the Financial Times called it "the think tank at the heart of the EU" while adding: "Although it describes itself as a think-tank, Eurofi defies categorisation."

History and activity

Eurofi was created in 2000 by French consultant Didier Cahen. Lebègue left in 2011, and in 2016 David Wright, former head of the European Commission's Directorate-General for the Internal Market (now DG FISMA), succeeded Larosière as Eurofi chair.

The main meetings organized by Eurofi are held twice a year, on the side of the informal ECOFIN meeting under the rotating presidency of the Council of the European Union: the "high-level seminar" in March or April, and the "financial forum" in September.  

The meetings are not public. Public officials who speak at Eurofi often publish the text of their speech on their own institution's website. Eurofi itself publishes curated summaries of the discussions, as well as articles by featured speakers assembled in twice-yearly volumes branded Views Magazine.

Eurofi is mainly financed by yearly subscriptions from its member organizations, most of which are financial firms. It had 66 members in 2019 and a budget above €3 million. It lists all member firms on its website.

Controversy

A full-page investigative article published by the Financial Times in September 2019 raised questions about the nature and role of Eurofi. It criticized Eurofi for lack of transparency, as its events have been closed to journalists since 2013; for letting its agenda be dominated by the special interests of the financial industry, particularly since 2010; for maintaining ambiguity about its official status, e.g. by using the logo of the six-month presidency of the Council; and for the high level of compensation of its consultant staff. It also observed that "Many EU officials contacted by the FT see going to Eurofi as part of their job."

See also
 European Union lobbying

Notes

European integration think tanks
Political and economic think tanks based in France
Political and economic think tanks based in the European Union
Lobbying organizations in Europe